A pedal (from the Latin pes pedis, "foot") is a lever designed to be operated by foot and may refer to:

Computers and other equipment 
 Footmouse, a foot-operated computer mouse
 In medical transcription, a pedal is used to control playback of voice dictations

Geometry 
 Pedal curve, a curve derived by construction from a given curve
 Pedal triangle, a triangle obtained by projecting a point onto the sides of a triangle

Music

Albums 
 Pedals (Rival Schools album)
 Pedals (Speak album)

Other music
 Bass drum pedal, a pedal used to play a bass drum while leaving the drummer's hands free to play other drums with drum sticks, hands, etc.
 Effects pedal, a pedal used commonly for electric guitars
 Pedal keyboard, a musical keyboard operated by the player's feet
 Pedal harp, a modern orchestral harp with pedals used to change the tuning of its strings
 Pedal point, a type of nonchord tone, usually in the bass
 Pedal tone, a fundamental tone played on brass instruments
 Piano pedals, typically three pedals used to soften, sustain, or selectively sustain notes played on a piano   
 Pedal piano, a kind of piano that includes a pedalboard
 Player piano, a kind of piano which plays prerecorded music, some designs of which are driven by pedals

Transportation
 Bicycle pedal, the part of a bicycle that the rider pushes with their foot to propel the vehicle
 Pedalo, a small boat, usually for recreation, propelled by one or more occupants using bicycle style pedals
 Automobile pedal, such as the accelerator, brake, and clutch
 Pedals (The Nottingham Cycling Campaign), a cycling advocacy group in Nottingham, England
 Rudder pedal, to control yaw on an airplane

Other uses
 Pedal bin, a container with a lid operated by a foot pedal
 Pedal bone or coffin bone, the last phalanx and most distal bone in the front and rear legs of horses, cattle, pigs, and other ruminants
 Pedals (bear)

See also
 Pedal boat (disambiguation)
 Pedal Pusher (disambiguation)
 Peddle, to sell something by going from place to place
 Peddle (surname)
 Petal (disambiguation)